Hechtman is a German surname. Notable people with the surname include:

Ken Hechtman (born 1967), Canadian freelance journalist and convicted drug dealer

See also
Hecht (surname)
Heckman

German-language surnames